KNG could refer to:

 Kaimana Airport, Papua, Indonesia, IATA code
 Kingman (Amtrak station), Arizona, US, Amtrak station code
 Kingston railway station (England), London, National Rail station code
 Koongo language, ISO 639-3 code
 Kootingal railway station, New South Wales, Australia, station code